Pallavolo Sirio Perugia was an Italian women's volleyball club based in Perugia. The club had success at national and international level during the years it was active.

Previous names
Due to sponsorship, the club have competed under the following names:
 Imet Perugia (1991–1992)
 Rasimelli&Coletti Perugia (1992–1993)
 Despar Perugia (1993–1994)
 Despar Sirio Perugia (1994–1995)
 Despar Perugia (1995–2001)
 Despar Colussi Perugia (2001–2002)
 Despar Perugia (2002–2003)
 Despar Sirio Perugia (2003–2004)
 Despar Perugia (2004–2011)

History
The club was created in 1970 in Perugia. It made its way through the lower leagues in Italy until it reached the highest Italian league, the Serie A1 in 1989. The first major title came at the 1991–92 Italian Cup, at the same season the club finished as Serie A1 runner up for a second consecutive year. The early 1990s strong results paved the way to the European competitions but it was only by the end of that decade and the early 2000s that the club transformed strong results into titles. A second Italian Cup title came in 1998–99, the first European title in the 1999–00 Cup Winners Cup and the first Serie A1 title arrived in 2002–03 together with a third Italian Cup. The double (league and cup) was repeated in 2004–05 with the club also taking the CEV Cup that season. In the following season it claimed the CEV Champions League title and in 2006–07 the club won the double (for a third time) and CEV Cup just like it did two seasons earlier. It added an Italian Supercup in 2007 and second Champions League in 2007–08.

In 2011 the club restructured itself, after the president decided to focus only on the youth teams and the club renounced participation on the 2011–12 Serie A1 season. A new club called  was created and, in collaboration with three clubs (APD Monteluce, San Sisto Volley and Pallavolo San Sisto), formed the Pallavolo Perugia group.

Team
The club's last team of the 2010–11 season. As of September 2010 

Coach:  Claudio César Cuello

Notable players

  Taismary Aguero (2001-2005)
  Mirka Francia (2000-2008)
  Simona Gioli (2002-2008)
  Antonella Del Core (2006-2008)
  Paola Croce (2001-2004)
  Elisa Togut (2008-2009)
  Neriman Özsoy (2010-2012)
  Dorota Swieniewicz (1997-2006)
  Irina Kirillova (2001-2004)
  Fofão (2004-2007)
  Walewska Oliveira (2004-2007)
  Nancy Metcalf (2003-2004)
  Hanka Pachale (2007-2008)
  Antonina Zetova (2005-2007/2009-2010)
  Neli Marinova (2007-2008)
  Regla Torres (1998-2000)
  Regla Bell (1998-2000)
  Yang Hao (2008-2009)
  Karina Ocasio (2003-2004)

Honours

National competitions
  National League: 3
2002–03, 2004–05, 2006–07

  Coppa Italia: 5
1991–92, 1998–99, 2002–03, 2004–05, 2006–07

  Italian Super Cup: 1
2007

International competitions
  CEV Champions League: 2
2005–06, 2007–08

  Cup Winners Cup: 1
1999–00

  CEV Cup: 2
2004–05, 2006–07

References

External links
Official website 

Italian women's volleyball clubs
Volleyball clubs established in 1970
1970 establishments in Italy
Defunct sports teams in Italy
Sports clubs disestablished in 2011
2011 disestablishments in Italy
Perugia
Sport in Umbria
Serie A1 (women's volleyball) clubs